LysKOM is a KOM-based conferencing system developed by the Lysator Academic Computer Society at Linköping University and Linköping Institute of Technology. It can be seen as a cross between news and e-mail, but with the presence and speed of IRC or IM-networks. The most common client is the LysKOM Emacs Lisp Client, but among others a WWW-based client also exists. The server and most clients are released under the terms of the GNU General Public License, and thus free software. The LysKOM protocol uses port 4894.

Protocol implementations exist for Python, Perl and Pike. Based on these frameworks, a number of programs for bridging LysKOM with other systems have been written. Notable among these is the Python software for importing and exporting e-mail. Used as a whole, it enables the LysKOM system to act as a primitive list manager. By configuring the exporter to not reexport imported e-mail it is also possible to use LysKOM more like a multi-user e-mail client for posting to mailing lists.

LysKOM also refers to the specific installation hosted by Lysator at kom.lysator.liu.se.

LysKOM installations 
LysKOM (kom.lysator.liu.se) at Lysator in Linköping.
HesaKOM (com.helsinki.fi) at University of Helsinki in Helsinki.
LuddKOM (kom.ludd.ltu.se) at LUDD|Ludd in Luleå.
SnoppKOM (city.dll.nu)
UppKOM (kom.update.uu.se) at Update in Uppsala.

Historical LysKOM installations, no longer available 
LysCOM, LysKOM in English (com.lysator.liu.se) at Lysator in Linköping. (Not functional as of November 2008.)
CD-KOM (kom.cd.chalmers.se) at Chalmers Computer Society in Gothenburg. (Not functional.)
DSKOM (kom.ds.hj.se) at DatorSektionen in Jönköping. (Not functional as of October 2022.)
MdS-KOM (kom.mds.mdh.se) at Mälardalens Studentkår in Eskilstuna. (Not functional.)
MysKOM (myskom.kfib.org). (Not functional as of October 2022.)
Roxen Community KOM (community.roxen.com) at Roxen in Linköping. (Not functional as of October 2022.)
RydKOM (kom.hem.liu.se) in Ryd in Linköping. (Not functional.)
TokKOM (kom.stacken.kth.se) at Stacken in Stockholm. (Not functional.)

External links 
The LysKOM system
The LysKOM Emacs Lisp Client
Note: This page is about the old distribution system. If you want to get a modern client which is being kept up to date with the changes in the servers, use the Daily Build link on the page, referring http://magnus.gustavsson.se/lyskom/beta/src/
LysKOM Protocol A
The Python LysKOM Protocol implementation

Internet protocols